Prince Daniel, Duke of Västergötland (born Olof Daniel Westling; 15 September 1973), is a member of the Swedish royal family. Prior to his marriage to the heir apparent, Crown Princess Victoria, he was a personal trainer and gym owner and ran a company called Balance Training with three gyms in central Stockholm.

Background and early life
Olof Daniel Westling was born on 15 September 1973 to Olle and Ewa Westling (born Ewa Westring) at Örebro Hospital, on the day Carl XVI Gustaf ascended the throne. His family initially lived in Örebro, but later moved to Ockelbo. He has a sister, Anna Westling Söderström (formerly Anna Westling Blom, born Anna Westling; 1970). Most of his ancestors were farmers in the province of Hälsingland. Daniel Westling was christened at Almby Church in January 1974. His family has Forest Finnish ancestry and his father is a leader in the Forest Finnish community.

After completing his education, he served for 15 months, as part of national conscription, in the Swedish Army at Hälsinge Regiment in Gävle and was honorably discharged as a second lieutenant. In 2001, he met the Crown Princess when he became her personal trainer.

On 1 July 2008, he moved into a one-bedroom rental apartment in the Pagebyggnaden building on the grounds of Drottningholm Palace. The move was confirmed by the Royal Court.

Career

In November 2009 it was reported that Westling was to step down as CEO and member of the Board of Directors of the Balance company. He would still be an equity partner. It was expected that the same procedure would be followed with his involvements in other companies before he became prince.

Engagement and marriage

On 24 February 2009, Westling and Crown Princess Victoria received the required consent of King Carl XVI Gustaf and the Government of Sweden for marriage. Such permission is necessary according to the terms of the Swedish Act of Succession.

Westling suffered from a congenital (but not hereditary) ailment causing impaired renal function. Three months after his engagement, on 28 May 2009, Westling underwent a kidney transplant at Karolinska University Hospital. His father was the donor. The operation was a success. Victoria could not be present when the operation took place because she was in Greenland at the time.

The wedding took place in Stockholm Cathedral on 19 June 2010, the 34th anniversary of her parents' wedding. After the wedding, the Duke and Duchess of Västergötland moved into the Haga Palace. On 26 September 2010, Daniel went on his first tour with Victoria, visiting France in connection with the Bernadotte anniversary.

On 17 August 2011, the Swedish royal court announced that Prince Daniel and Crown Princess Victoria were expecting their first child in March 2012. She gave birth to a girl on 23 February 2012, Princess Estelle, Duchess of Östergötland. Daniel took his paternity leave and switched parental roles with Victoria when Estelle began preschool. Their second child, Prince Oscar, Duke of Skåne, was born on 2 March 2016.

Charity work

Patronage 
Prince Daniel is a patron in the following organizations: A Swedish Classic, The Healthy Generation Foundation, International Society of Nephrology, More Organ Donation.

Areas of work

Health 
The Duke of Västergötland is an honorary chairman of the board of the Swedish Heart-Lung Foundation and has given his name to Prince Daniel's Grant for Promising Young Researchers. Prince Daniel invented Prince Daniel's Race and Sports Day, which are arranged each year to encourage more young people to get exercise and to take an interest in sport. The game is in association with the Swedish Sports Confederation.

Prince Daniel and Crown Princess Victoria established a foundation to mark the occasion of their marriage in 2010. The focus of the foundation is to combat exclusion and promote good health among children and young people in Sweden. The couple took the initiative for Generation PEP, a non-profit organisation that works to raise awareness of and encourage commitment to issues relating to the health of children and young people.

Entrepreneurship 
Each year, Prince Daniel visits the Swedish Young Enterprise Championship. He is also a member of Young Enterprise's national board.

The Prince Daniel's Fellowship project and its entrepreneurial programme were launched in January 2013. Prince Daniel with business leaders and entrepreneurs visits upper secondary schools, universities and university colleges around Sweden to inspire young people to get involved in entrepreneurship. This project is a long-term partnership between Prince Daniel and the Royal Swedish Academy of Engineering Sciences.

Titles, styles, honours and arms

Titles and styles
Sweden has practised absolute primogeniture only since 1980. This means that Victoria is the first female heir apparent, and questions arose as to how Westling would be known after their marriage.

When Carl XVI Gustaf married Silvia Sommerlath in 1976, he discontinued the established norm that Swedish princes must marry royalty to be eligible to inherit the throne. But men, royal or not, had only twice before, in the 13th and 17th centuries, obtained new title or rank as the spouse of a Swedish princess, and even three queens regnant left no clear precedent. Margaret (reigned 1388–1412) was the widow of Haakon VI of Norway and Christina (reigned 1632–1654) was unmarried. The most recent Ulrika Eleonora (reigned 1718–1720) was already married during her tenure as queen regnant: her husband, Frederick, was given the style "Royal Highness" during his tenure as consort, a style granted to him by the estates. Ulrika Eleonora later abdicated so her consort Frederick—who was born a prince of Hesse-Kassel—could be king. In Daniel's case, the Swedes were treading on new ground.

The Swedish Royal Court announced that Westling would become "Prince Daniel" and "Duke of Västergötland", corresponding in form to the style used by previous Swedish princes, including Victoria's younger brother Prince Carl Philip, Duke of Värmland, i.e. Prince + Given name + Duke of Province.

As was further announced in May 2010, on his wedding day Westling was made a prince of Sweden and was granted the style Royal Highness, making him an official member of the Swedish royal family and on par with other senior members of the royal family, such as Prince Carl Philip, Princess Madeleine and Princess Lilian. At Stockholm Cathedral, he was also then made a knight of the Royal Order of the Seraphim and already wore its badge and ribbon upon emerging after the ceremony.

Since his marriage, Daniel has been styled as "His Royal Highness Prince Daniel, Duke of Västergötland". He added the surname of the Swedish royal family, Bernadotte, making his full legal name Olof Daniel Westling Bernadotte. When referring to both him and his wife, they are called the Crown Princess Couple.

Honours

National honours
 :
 Knight of the Royal Order of the Seraphim (LoK av KMO)
 Knight Commander of the Royal Order of the Polar Star (KNO2kl)
 Recipient of the Ruby Jubilee Medal of King Carl XVI Gustaf
 Recipient of the 70th Birthday Badge Medal of King Carl XVI Gustaf

Foreign honours
 :
 Grand Cross of the Order of Bernardo O'Higgins
 :
 Grand Cross of the Order of the Cross of Terra Mariana
 :
 Grand Cross of the Order of the White Rose of Finland
 : 
  Grand Cross 1st class of the Order of Merit of the Federal Republic of Germany (7 September 2021)
 :
 Grand Cross of the Order of the Falcon
:
 Knight Grand Cross of the Order of Merit of the Italian Republic
 :
 Grand Cross of the Order of the Crown (11 October 2022)
 :
 Knight Grand Cross of the Order of St. Olav
 :
 Grand Gwanghwa Medal of the Order of Diplomatic Service Merit
 :
 Knight Grand Cross of the Order of Civil Merit (16 November 2021)
 :
 Grand Officer of the Order of Merit

Arms

Prince Daniel's coat of arms is based on the greater coat of arms of Sweden. It features in the first and fourth quarters, the Three Crowns; in the second, the lion of the House of Bjelbo; and in the third, the lion of the arms of Västergötland, representing the titular designation of his and his wife's dukedom. In the centre, on an inescutcheon, is his personal arms (Westling). This Westling escutcheon is based on the arms of Ockelbo. Surrounding the shield is the chain of the Order of the Seraphim, of which he has been a member since his wedding.

References

External links

 The Royal Court's biography

People from Örebro
1973 births
Living people
Swedish chief executives
Exercise instructors
Kidney transplant recipients
Swedish princes
Dukes of Västergötland

Recipients of the Order of the Cross of Terra Mariana, 1st Class
Grand Crosses 1st class of the Order of Merit of the Federal Republic of Germany
Knights Grand Cross of the Order of the Falcon
Swedish people of Forest Finnish descent
Order of Civil Merit members
Grand Crosses of the Order of the Crown (Netherlands)